The Acaya Open was a golf tournament on the Challenge Tour, played at the Acaya Golf Resort in Italy. It was first held in 2011, when Jamie Moul won the tournament. Espen Kofstad of Norway won the second and final event in 2012.

Winners

External links
Coverage on the Challenge Tour's official site

Former Challenge Tour events
Golf tournaments in Italy